The 1960 Princeton Tigers football team was an American football team that represented Princeton University during the 1960 NCAA University Division football season. Princeton finished second in the Ivy League.

In their fourth year under head coach Dick Colman, the Tigers compiled a 7–2 record and outscored opponents 232 to 133. Donald M. Kornrumpf was the team captain.

Princeton's 6–1 conference record was second-best in the Ivy League standings. The Tigers outscored Ivy opponents 188 to 94. 

Princeton played its home games at Palmer Stadium on the university campus in Princeton, New Jersey.

Schedule

References

Princeton
Princeton Tigers football seasons
Princeton Tigers football